Rauf Lala (Urdu: رؤف لالہ; born 1970 in Larkana, Sindh, Pakistan) is a Pakistani comedian, actor, writer, and producer. Working in Pakistani media for over three decades, he is well known for his comedic talent and stage work. Lala has also worked in India, winning season two of The Great Indian Laughter Challenge. He participated in Pakistan's Reality TV Show Tamasha Season 1 and emerged as one of the 4 finalists in the show.

Career
Rauf Lala began his stage career in 1985, as a comedian in One Day Theater, Karachi, alongside his teacher, Razak Rajo. His first commercial show was Susral Bara Janjaal also in 1985, which featured Umer Sharif and Javed Sheikh.

He has collaborated with Umer Sharif and Moin Akhtar on many stage shows, including Bhudda Ghar Per Hai, and in 1989, Bakra Qistoon Pay, which remains a popular and well-known Pakistani stage show internationally. Lala has appeared on several comedy reality shows, gaining popularity on television, as well as appearing in movies in Pakistan and India.

In 2006, he was invited to appear in season two of The Great Indian Laughter Challenge, an Indian reality television show on channel Star One, which he won. He was awarded the title "Comedy Ka Shahenshah", becoming the first Pakistani to win the major Indian contest. He appeared alongside actress Bipasha Basu in the final episode.

Filmography

Television 
Lala has worked in various serials, commercials and television films, including:
 Ek Raat Ek Kahani
 Funny Family
 Super Karara
 Comedy Kings
 Comedy Champions
 The Great Indian Family Drama

Shows

See also 
 List of Lollywood actors

References

External links
 BBC News Article
 
 Rediff Profile

1970 births
Living people
Muhajir people
Pakistani male comedians
Pakistani male stage actors
Male actors from Karachi
Writers from Karachi
20th-century Pakistani male actors
21st-century Pakistani male actors